Nalliah Devarajan (born 24 August 1965) is a Sri Lankan former cricketer who played in 45 first-class and 11 List A matches between 1988/89 and 2000/01. He is now an umpire, and stood in matches in the 2020–21 Major Clubs Limited Over Tournament.

References

External links
 

1965 births
Living people
Sri Lankan cricketers
Sri Lankan cricket umpires
Antonians Sports Club cricketers
Nondescripts Cricket Club cricketers
Place of birth missing (living people)